Pericoptus truncatus is a large sand scarab beetle. It is native to New Zealand and is found on beaches throughout New Zealand. Its Māori name is ngungutawa.

The adult spends the daylight hours buried in the sand, emerging at night to fly noisily around in search of mates and food. It leaves obvious trails in the sand when walking around. The female lays eggs deep in the sand and the large white grubs can often be found under driftwood, though they feed on roots of dune plants.

Description 
Thomas Broun described the species as follows:

Distribution and habitat 

Pericoptus truncatus lives in sandy shore areas where driftwood is present, from Ninety Mile beach to Surat Bay, near Bluff.  The beetle and its larvae inhabit the area extending from above the high tide mark and including the dunes fronting the beach.  They do not seem to occur in dunes found further inland.

The larvae, pupae and adults are common amongst the roots of marram grass and under or within driftwood. The beetles can be found to be living up to 1.2m below ground.

Ecology 
Pericoptus truncatus larvae have an unknown association with the Mumulaelaps ammochostos mite, which are found living on the outside of the larvae. The association is unlikely to be parasitic and it has been suggested that the mites may actually feed on other mites and nematodes associated with the larvae.

Threats

An exotic Scoliidae wasp, the yellow flower wasp, Radumeris tasmaniensis has been found in Northland, North Island, New Zealand. This has been a cause for concern as R. tasmaniensis parasitises on the large sand scarab's larvae. The female stings and paralyses the scarab larva and lays eggs on it. The wasp larva then slowly consumes the paralysed beetle larva.

Parasites 
At certain times of the month Pericoptus truncatus larvae have been observed immersing themselves in the saltwater saturated sand at the low tide zone for a period & then returning to the sand dunes. This behaviour was mostly conducted under the safety of night-time. It has been suggested that this may be the larvae's effort to remove themselves of parasites.

References

External links

Image of Pericoptus truncatus larva in sand
Drawing of a Pericoptus truncatus larvae
Pericoptus truncatus discussed on RNZ Critter of the Week, 6 September 2019

Dynastinae
Beetles of New Zealand
Endemic fauna of New Zealand
Beetles described in 1775
Taxa named by Johan Christian Fabricius
Endemic insects of New Zealand